The Boca Raton Sabres were a soccer club based in Boca Raton, Florida, that competed in the USISL.

Year-by-year

External links 
 Boca Raton Sabr website (youth soccer league)

Defunct soccer clubs in Florida
1992 establishments in Florida
1994 disestablishments in Florida
Association football clubs established in 1992
Association football clubs disestablished in 1994